Teaching Mathematics and Its Applications is a quarterly peer-reviewed academic journal in the field of mathematics education. The Journal was established in 1982 and is published by Oxford University Press on behalf of the Institute of Mathematics and its Applications. The editors-in-chief are Duncan Lawson (Newman University, Birmingham), Chris Sangwin (University of Edinburgh), and Anne Watson (University of Oxford).

The journal is abstracted and indexed in the British Education Index, Education Research Abstracts, Educational Management Abstracts, Educational Technology Abstracts, MathEduc Database, and ProQuest databases.

See also 
 List of mathematics education journals

References

External links 
 
 Submission website
 Institute of Mathematics and its Applications

English-language journals
Mathematics education in the United Kingdom
Mathematics education journals
Oxford University Press academic journals
Publications established in 1982
Triannual journals
1982 establishments in England